Oncopeltus sandarachatus is a species of seed bug in the family Lygaeidae, found in North, Central, and South America.

References

External links

 

Lygaeidae